Battlefronts is an Australian lifestyle and DIY television series that aired on the Nine Network in 2008. It is hosted by former Olympic swimmer, Giaan Rooney.

Nine Network original programming
2008 Australian television series debuts
2008 Australian television series endings